Anthony Jarrad Morrow (born September 27, 1985) is an American former professional basketball player and executive who was most recently an executive for the Oklahoma City Thunder of the National Basketball Association (NBA). He played college basketball for Georgia Tech. He went undrafted in the 2008 NBA draft but was later signed by the Golden State Warriors. He is known for his three-point shooting. In February 2023 he was arrested for multiple assault-related charges including kidnapping and strangulation for the alleged assault of his girlfriend.

College career
Morrow played four years of college basketball for Georgia Tech, where in 123 games, he made 70 starts and averaged 11.4 points, 3.3 rebounds and 1.0 assists per game.

Professional career

Golden State Warriors (2008–2010)
After going undrafted in the 2008 NBA draft, Morrow joined the Golden State Warriors for the 2008 NBA Summer League. On July 24, 2008, he signed with the Warriors.

In his first NBA start, he scored 37 points on 15-for-20 shooting against the Los Angeles Clippers—the most points ever scored in a game by an undrafted player in his rookie season—and grabbed 11 rebounds. Morrow finished the 2008–09 season as the first rookie and first Warrior ever to lead the league in three-point field goal shooting, going 86-for-184 for a .467 percentage.

Morrow re-joined the Warriors for the 2009 NBA Summer League, where he scored 47 points for the Warriors in a game against the New Orleans Hornets – setting the record for the most points scored by an individual in a game at the NBA Summer League.

In the 13th game of the 2009–10 NBA season, Morrow set a new career high with 6 three-pointers in a victory over the Dallas Mavericks.

New Jersey Nets (2010–2012)
On July 13, 2010, Morrow was traded to the New Jersey Nets for a future second-round draft pick.

At the end of the 2010–11 NBA season, Morrow had the second highest 3-point percentage in history (behind Steve Kerr).

On February 3, 2012, Morrow scored a career-high 42 points in a loss to the Minnesota Timberwolves.

Atlanta Hawks (2012–2013)
On July 11, 2012, the Nets traded Morrow, Johan Petro, Jordan Farmar, Jordan Williams, and DeShawn Stevenson to the Atlanta Hawks for Joe Johnson.

Dallas Mavericks (2013)
On February 21, 2013, the Atlanta Hawks traded Morrow to the Dallas Mavericks for Dahntay Jones.

New Orleans Pelicans (2013–2014)

On July 18, 2013, Morrow signed a one-year contract with the New Orleans Pelicans.

Oklahoma City Thunder (2014–2017)
On July 16, 2014, Morrow signed a three-year, $10 million contract with the Oklahoma City Thunder. On April 1, 2015, he scored a season-high 32 points on 11-of-16 shooting in a loss to the Dallas Mavericks.

On January 4, 2016, Morrow scored a season-high 20 points in a loss to the Sacramento Kings.

Chicago Bulls (2017)
On February 23, 2017, Morrow was traded, along with Joffrey Lauvergne and Cameron Payne, to the Chicago Bulls in exchange for Taj Gibson, Doug McDermott and a 2018 second-round draft pick.

On September 18, 2017, Morrow signed with the Portland Trail Blazers. He was waived on October 13 after appearing in five preseason games.

NBA career statistics

Regular season

|-
| style="text-align:left;"|
| style="text-align:left;"|Golden State
| 67 || 17 || 22.6 || .478 || style="background:#cfecec;"| .467* || .870 || 3.0 || 1.2 || .5 || .2 || 10.1
|-
| style="text-align:left;"|
| style="text-align:left;"|Golden State
| 69 || 37 || 29.2 || .468 || .456 || .886 || 3.8 || 1.5 || .9 || .2 || 13.0
|-
| style="text-align:left;"|
| style="text-align:left;"|New Jersey
| 58 || 47 || 32.0 || .450 || .423 || .897 || 3.0 || 1.2 || .3 || .1 || 13.2
|-
| style="text-align:left;"|
| style="text-align:left;"|New Jersey
| 62 || 18 || 26.4 || .413 || .371 || .933 || 2.0 || 1.0 || .7 || .1 || 12.0
|-
| style="text-align:left;"|
| style="text-align:left;"|Atlanta
| 24 || 1 || 12.5 || .423 || .395 || .889 || 1.1 || .4 || .5 || .0 || 5.2
|-
| style="text-align:left;"|
| style="text-align:left;"|Dallas
| 17 || 0 || 4.8 || .500 || .200 || 1.000 || .2 || .2 || .1 || .0 || 2.3
|-
| style="text-align:left;"|
| style="text-align:left;"|New Orleans
| 76 || 9 || 18.8 || .458 || .451 || .828 || 1.8 || .8 || .5 || .2 || 8.4
|-
| style="text-align:left;"|
| style="text-align:left;"|Oklahoma City
| 74 || 0 || 24.4 || .463 || .431 || .888 || 2.6 || .8 || .7 || .1 || 10.7
|-
| style="text-align:left;"|
| style="text-align:left;"|Oklahoma City
| 68 || 6 || 13.6 || .408 || .387 || .744 || .9 || .4 || .3 || .1 || 5.6
|-
| style="text-align:left;"|
| style="text-align:left;"|Oklahoma City
| 40 || 7 || 15.7 || .387 || .294 || .885 || .7 || .5 || .5 || .1 || 5.8
|-
| style="text-align:left;"|
| style="text-align:left;"|Chicago
| 9 || 0 || 9.7 || .414 || .429 || 1.000 || .2 || .7 || .2 || .0 || 4.6
|- class="sortbottom"
| style="text-align:center;" colspan="2"|Career
| 564 || 142 || 21.8 || .447 || .417 || .880 || 2.2 || .9 || .6 || .1 || 9.4

Playoffs

|-
| style="text-align:left;"|2016
| style="text-align:left;"|Oklahoma City
| 14 || 0 || 5.4 || .458 || .357 || 1.000 || .1 || .1 || .1 || .0 || 2.6
|-
| style="text-align:left;"|2017
| style="text-align:left;"|Chicago
| 3 || 0 || 9.7 || .556 ||  || 1.000 || 1.0 || .7 || .0 || .0 || 4.0
|- class="sortbottom"
| style="text-align:center;" colspan="2"|Career
| 17 || 0 || 6.2 || .485 || .357 || 1.000 || .3 || .2 || .1 || .0 || 2.9

References

External links

 
 

1985 births
Living people
African-American basketball players
American men's basketball players
Atlanta Hawks players
Basketball players from Charlotte, North Carolina
Big3 players
Chicago Bulls players
Dallas Mavericks players
Georgia Tech Yellow Jackets men's basketball players
Golden State Warriors players
New Jersey Nets players
New Orleans Pelicans players
Oklahoma City Thunder players
Shooting guards
Undrafted National Basketball Association players
21st-century African-American sportspeople
20th-century African-American people
American men's 3x3 basketball players